Otoniel is a given name. Notable people with this name include:

 Dario Antonio Úsuga, Colombian drug trafficker (nicknamed 'Otoniel')
 Otoniel Olivas (born 1968), Nicaraguan footballer
 Otoniel Quintana (1946–2018), Colombian footballer, mostly played for  Millonarios
 Otoniel Gonzaga (tenor singer) (1942–2018), Filipino singer
 Otoniel Gonzaga (sport shooter) (1913–?), Filipino sports shooter
 Otoniel Carranza (born 1983), Salvadorean footballer